Lindsay Gael Christian Elaine Armaou (born 18 December 1978) is a Greek-born Irish actress and singer. She is best known as a member of girl group B*Witched and for her roles as Sister Georgina in the crime thriller film The Smoke (2014) and Marlene Flynn in the Netflix drama Stay Close (2021).

Early life and education
Armaou was born on 18 December 1978 in Athens, Greece, to a Greek father and an Irish mother. She plays piano and guitar, having learned both before she was thirteen years old. She also wrote music of her own prior to being in B*Witched.

Career

1998–02: B*Witched and hiatus
In 1998, Edele Lynch formed the group 'Butterfly Farm' with her twin sister Keavy Lynch and their friend Sinéad O'Carroll. The trio began writing and recording together, but soon realised that there was "someone missing". Upon a friend Graham’s suggestion, they asked Armaou to come for an audition and she played a tape recording of a song called “United We Stand” she had written. The other girls liked it and Armaou became the fourth member of the band, who later changed their name to B*Witched. B*Witched enjoyed huge success worldwide, becoming the first act in history to have their first four singles debut at number one in the UK. Their self-titled debut album also topped the UK Albums Chart and peaked at number 9 on the US Billboard Hot 100. B*Witched split up in 2002 and, after, she took a seven-year hiatus.

2009–present: Acting career and B*Witched reunion
From 2008 to 2011, Armaou trained as an actress at The Poor School, an acting school in London's King's Cross. She has played the parts of Portia in Merchant of Venice, Isabelle in Ring Round the Moon, Felicity Rumpers in Habeas Corpus, Anya in The Cherry Orchard and the Ghost of Christmas Present in A Christmas Carol. In April 2012, Lindsay was cast in her first feature film role as Sister Georgina in the British indie crime thriller, Two Days in the Smoke alongside Matt Di Angelo, Stephen Marcus and Alan Ford.

On 18 October 2012, it was announced that the original members of B*Witched would reunite for an ITV2 series entitled The Big Reunion along with five other pop groups of their time: 911, Liberty X, Five, Honeyz and Atomic Kitten. The show turned into The Big Reunion series of concerts around the UK and Ireland throughout 2013.

In 2021, Armaou began starring as Marlene Flynn in the Netflix drama Stay Close.

Personal life
Armaou married 911's Lee Brennan in September 2006, but they split up in 2011.

In October 2015, she married Indi Pahl, a recruitment director, in a private ceremony. They live together in Manchester. Armaou gave birth to a daughter, Sophia Helena Pahl, in July 2017. The couple's son, Ayrton Rai Pahl, was born in May 2019.

Filmography

Film

Television

Web series

Internet

Stage

Discography

Featured singles

References

External links

Living people
1978 births
20th-century Irish women singers
Irish film actresses
Irish pop singers
Irish pop musicians
Greek emigrants to Ireland
Irish people of Greek descent
21st-century Irish women singers
B*Witched members